Mike Salonga Cortez (born November 10, 1980) is a Filipino-American former professional basketball player. He last played for the Blackwater Elite of the Philippine Basketball Association (PBA). Cortez gained prominence in the amateur ranks for the De La Salle Green Archers in the UAAP and the ICTSI Archers in the Philippine Basketball League. In 2003, he was the first overall pick of Alaska Aces in the 2003 PBA draft.

Amateur career
In 2000, Cortez debuted for the De La Salle Green Archers. With him, veterans Ren-Ren Ritualo and later Mark Cardona, the Green Archers won two of the three UAAP titles from 2000–2002.

He also played in the PBL for the ICTSI Archers, a team composed mostly of DLSU players alongside then University of the East star James Yap. With the two playing together, ICTSI almost won a PBL title in 2001 only to be defeated by the veteran-laiden Shark Energy Drink.

By 2002, Cortez's performance had quickly led to him being considered the top prospect for the PBA. He was included in the mythical 5 in the 2000 and 2002 UAAP season.

Professional career

After the 2002 UAAP season, Cortez applied for the 2003 PBA draft and was quickly drafted by the Alaska Aces as the top overall pick. By then, he was considered as the successor to Johnny Abarrientos as the team's next big star at the point guard position.

However, he struggled in his first season in the pros with inconsistent performances due to Tim Cone's triangle offense system, and the emphasis on Ali Peek, Don Allado and fellow rookie Brandon Cablay. Despite this development, he was a member of the 2003 PBA Invitational Champions defeating the Coca-Cola Tigers.

He lost in the Rookie of the Year race to fellow point guard Jimmy Alapag of the Talk 'N Text Phone Pals.

By the 2004–05 PBA season, he was starting to increase his role as Alaska added young players such as Sonny Thoss, and veterans Reynel Hugnatan and Jeffrey Cariaso.

The next season, he played probably his best season in the league, playing in a consistent level while forming a two-man tandem with Willie Miller as Alaska almost went to the PBA Philippine Cup finals, but they lost to the eventual champion Purefoods Chunkee Giants 4–3.

He missed most of the 2006–07 PBA Philippine Cup following a season-ending ACL injury in the third game of the conference.

On March 19, 2008, he was traded along with big man Ken Bono to the Magnolia Beverage Masters (now renamed back to San Miguel Beermen) for LA Tenorio and Larry Fonacier.

In 2009, after recuperating from his second ACL injury in his pro career, he received the Comeback Player of the Year award for his role in the 2009 PBA Fiesta Conference title of the San Miguel Beermen. His second conference title and third overall in the PBA.

On June 11, 2010, he played his last game with Air21 as he was traded after that game for Ginebra's Billy Mamaril.

Although he helped Alaska and San Miguel win a single title each, the Cool Cat did not win a crown with the Barangay Ginebra. But he recorded his first triple-double in his pro career with the Kings on Game 3 of the 2012 PBA Commissioner's Cup Quarterfinals against B-Meg Llamados when he registered 17 points, 11 rebounds and 10 assists earning Best Player of the Game honors.

On November 7, 2012, he was traded back to the Express, in exchange for rookie Yousef Taha, where he reunited with coach Franz Pumaren, Ren-Ren Ritualo and Cholo Villanueva — all members of the 2001 La Salle four-peat squad.

On September 6, 2013, he was traded to Meralco Bolts in exchange for the rights of Asi Taulava, who at that time was coming off a successful campaign in the ASEAN Basketball League with San Miguel Beermen.

On August 7, 2015, Cortez and James Sena were traded by Meralco to the Blackwater Elite in exchange for Larry Rodriguez, who was also traded by the Bolts to the Talk 'N Text Tropang Texters via the Elite in exchange for Jimmy Alapag.

On September 1, 2016 he was traded by the Blackwater Elite to the GlobalPort Batang Pier in exchange for Ronald Pascual.

PBA career statistics

Correct as of the end of 2019 season

Season-by-season averages

|-
| align=left | 
| align=left | Alaska
| 56 || 34.9 || .401 || .262 || .782 || 4.4 || 4.2 || 1.5 || .4 || 11.4
|-
| align=left | 
| align=left | Alaska
| 57 || 34.4 || .391 || .382 || .774 || 4.1 || 5.5 || 1.1 || .3 || 12.3
|-
| align=left | 
| align=left | Alaska
| 46 || 33.4 || .408 || .313 || .708 || 4.0 || 4.8 || .9 || .2 || 12.8
|-
| align=left | 
| align=left | Alaska
| 23 || 27.7 || .437 || .270 || .716 || 3.4 || 3.6 || 1.4 || .1 || 11.3
|-
| align=left | 
| align=left | Alaska / Magnolia
| 55 || 29.6 || .416 || .349 || .765 || 3.8 || 4.4 || 1.0 || .4 || 10.8
|-
| align=left | 
| align=left | San Miguel
| 19 || 20.4 || .392 || .328 || .679 || 2.6 || 2.3 || .5 || .3 || 8.9
|-
| align=left | 
| align=left | San Miguel / Air21 (first era) / Barangay Ginebra
| 49 || 23.4 || .429 || .325 || .782 || 3.4 || 3.4 || .9 || .2 || 9.4
|-
| align=left | 
| align=left | Barangay Ginebra
| 57 || 23.4 || .396 || .340 || .735 || 3.1 || 2.9 || .6 || .3 || 6.8
|-
| align=left | 
| align=left | Barangay Ginebra
| 45 || 27.9 || .395 || .414 || .740 || 3.9 || 3.8 || .9 || .2 || 9.4
|-
| align=left | 
| align=left | Barangay Ginebra / Air21 (second era)
| 42 || 28.1 || .414 || .338 || .644 || 4.4 || 4.3 || 1.3 || .2 || 9.3
|-
| align=left | 
| align=left | Meralco
| 15 || 31.6 || .481 || .404 || .793 || 3.3 || 5.3 || .7 || .4 || 11.5
|-
| align=left | 
| align=left | Meralco
| 41 || 26.3 || .374 || .316 || .594 || 2.8 || 2.9 || .8 || .1 || 6.6
|-
| align=left | 
| align=left | Blackwater
| 27 || 31.9 || .410 || .304 || .851 || 3.7 || 4.3 || 1.0 || .2 || 9.9
|-
| align=left | 
| align=left | GlobalPort
| 35 || 23.3 || .441 || .337 || .778 || 3.1 || 2.1 || 1.0 || .1 || 6.9
|-
| align=left | 
| align=left | Blackwater
| 23 || 14.0 || .380 || .350 || .692 || 2.0 || 1.7 || .6 || .1 || 3.3
|-
| align=left | 
| align=left | Blackwater
| 30 || 16.4 || .426 || .237 || 1.000 || 1.9 || 1.7 || .9 || .0 || 3.1
|-class=sortbottom
| align=center colspan=2 | Career
| 620 || 26.7 || .412 || .329 || .752 || 3.4 || 3.6 || .9 || .2 || 9.0

References 

1980 births
Living people
Air21 Express players
Alaska Aces (PBA) draft picks
Alaska Aces (PBA) players
American men's basketball players
Barako Bull Energy players
Barangay Ginebra San Miguel players
Basketball players from San Jose, California
Blackwater Bossing players
De La Salle Green Archers basketball players
Filipino men's basketball players
Meralco Bolts players
NorthPort Batang Pier players
Philippine Basketball Association All-Stars
Point guards
San Miguel Beermen players
American sportspeople of Filipino descent
Citizens of the Philippines through descent